Dioicomyces is a genus of fungi in the family Laboulbeniaceae. The genus contain 32 species.

References

External links
Dioicomyces at Index Fungorum

Laboulbeniomycetes